Alexander Francis Kirkpatrick (25 June 1849 – 22 January 1940) was Regius Professor of Hebrew at Cambridge University (1882–1903) and the third Master of Selwyn College, Cambridge (1898–1907).

Life
Kirkpatrick was born at Lewes, East Sussex, only son (with three daughters) of Rev. Francis Kirkpatrick, and was educated at Haileybury and Trinity College, Cambridge.

He also served as Canon of Ely (1882–1903), Dean of Ely (1906 -1936), Examining Chaplain to the Bishop of Winchester (1895–1903) and General Editor for Old Testament and Apocrypha of the Cambridge Bible for Schools and Colleges (1892–1929), to which he contributed the commentaries on 1 and 2 Samuel and the Psalms. In his introduction to the book of Psalms, he observed that "they repeat the whispers of the Spirit of God, they reflect the very light of the Eternal Wisdom".

In 1884, Kirkpatrick married Julia Mary (1858-1943), daughter of Rev. J. Pemberton Bartlett, rector of Exbury, Hampshire. They had five sons and a daughter.

References

Regius Professors of Hebrew (Cambridge)
1849 births
1940 deaths
People educated at Haileybury and Imperial Service College
Masters of Selwyn College, Cambridge
Deans of Ely
Alumni of Trinity College, Cambridge
Lady Margaret's Professors of Divinity